The 1957 FIBA European Championship, commonly called FIBA EuroBasket 1957, was the tenth FIBA EuroBasket regional basketball championship, held by FIBA Europe.  Sixteen national teams affiliated with the International Basketball Federation (FIBA) entered the competition.  The competition was hosted by Bulgaria. Vasil Levski National Stadium in Sofia was the location of the event.

Results

Preliminary round
In the preliminary round, the 16 teams were split up into four groups of four teams each.  The top two teams in each group advanced to the final round to play for the first 8 places, while the bottom two were sent to the classification round to play for 9th through 16th.

Group A

Group B

Group C

Group D

Classification round
For the first time, the classification round, like the final round, was played as an 8-team round robin, with no further playoffs.

Final round
The final round was played as an 8-team round robin, with no further playoffs.

Yugoslavia was the first of the pool leaders to take a loss in the final round, playing against Bulgaria, who had won their division.

Bulgaria continued to oust division leaders, knocking Czechoslovakia out of the undefeated group.  Romania and the Soviet Union each defeated their second opponents, joining Bulgaria at the top of the pool.

The Soviet team pulled off a close win over the Czechoslovakian team that had broken the Soviets' lossless European championship start at 32 games.  Romania lost a rematch with preliminary round opponent Hungary, as those two teams went to 2–1 behind the Soviets and Bulgarians, who had each maintained perfect records in their first three games.  

Bulgaria and the Soviet Union each won their 7th game of the tournament and 4th of the final round, improving to 4–0.  Hungary stayed close behind, at 3–1, with Romania and Czechoslovakia staying in contention at 2–2.

The Soviets and Bulgarians remained undefeated as Hungary, falling to Bulgaria, dropped to 2 games behind them at 3–2 along with Czechoslovakia.

Improving to 6–0 each, the Soviet Union and Bulgaria set up a match between the two of them that would determine the championship in the seventh and final game of the round.  

The Soviet Union trailed by 4 points at halftime in their decisive game against Bulgaria.  The second half saw an explosion of scoring, with the Soviets adding 41 points in the frame to the 19 they had in the first half.  Bulgaria wasn't able to maintain the pace, scoring only 34 in the second half to fall to the Soviets 60–57.  Poland picked up their first win of the final round, defeating France, who fell to 0–7.

Final standings

Team rosters
1. Soviet Union: Viktor Zubkov, Valdis Muižnieks, Maigonis Valdmanis, Guram Minashvili, Yuri Ozerov, Mikhail Semyonov, Arkady Bochkarov, Stasys Stonkus, Vladimir Torban, Algirdas Lauritėnas, Mart Laga, Mikhail Studenetski (Coach: Stepan Spandaryan)

2. Bulgaria: Viktor Radev, Georgi Panov, Ilija Mirchev, Ljubomir Panov, Cvjatko Barchovski, Petko Lazarov, Mikhail Semov, Georgi Kanev, Vladimir Ganchev, Metodi Tomovski, Konstantin Totev, Atanas Pejchinski (Coach: Ljudmil Katerinski)

3. Czechoslovakia: Jiří Baumruk, Zdeněk Bobrovský, Miroslav Škeřík, Jaroslav Šíp, Dušan Lukášik, Zdeněk Rylich, Jaroslav Tetiva, Luboš Kolář, Milan Merkl, Jiří Tetiva, Jaroslav Chocholáč, Nikolaj Ordnung (Coach: Gustáv Herrmann)

4. Hungary: János Greminger, László Tóth, Tibor Zsíros, László Bánhegyi, János Bencze, János Simon, László Gabányi, Tibor Czinkán, István Sahin-Tóth, Ervin Keszey, Zoltán Judik, Pál Borbély, István Liptai (Coach: Zoltán Csányi)

6. Yugoslavia:  Miodrag Nikolić, Marjan Kandus, Branko Radović, Lajos Engler, Ljubomir Katić, Milutin Minja, Ivo Daneu, Branko Miletić, Bogdan Müller, Vilmos Lóczi, Boris Kristančič, Matija Dermastia (Coach: Aleksandar Nikolić)

External links
FIBA Europe EuroBasket 1957
Eurobasket.com 1957 EChampionship

1957
1957 in basketball
Basketball
Sports competitions in Sofia
June 1957 sports events in Europe
1950s in Sofia